Germain Authié (1927–2001) was a French politician. He served as Senator of Ariège from 1980 to 1998.

References

Page on the Senate website

1927 births
2001 deaths
Socialist Party (France) politicians
French Senators of the Fifth Republic
Senators of Ariège (department)